The Battle of Sorauren was part of a series of engagements in late July 1813 called the Battle of the Pyrenees in which a combined British and Portuguese force under Sir Arthur Wellesley held off Marshal Soult's French forces attempting to relieve Pamplona.

Prelude
With sizable Anglo-Portuguese forces tied up in assaulting San Sebastián and besieging Pamplona, the new French commander Marshal Soult launched a counterattack with the Armée d'Espagne through Maya and Roncesvalles. Although the French initially enjoyed local superiority, the tough terrain combined with stubborn British and Portuguese resistance slowed the French advance to a crawl.

Battle

The main French column of about 40,000 men under Clausel and Reille marched to attack Sorauren. On the 27July the heavily outnumbered British forces there were drawn up on the Oricain Ridge. Wellesley made a dramatic ride along the ridge in front of the cheering British and Portuguese troops and Soult postponed the attack until the next day. By the time the French attack was launched, reinforcements had arrived, bringing the total allied force to about 24,000 men.

On the 28th the fighting at the top of the ridge was bitter and bloody, but the defenders held the French off. About midday, the 6th Division arrived and Wellesley sent them to assault the French right flank. More fresh units reached the field and Soult soon ordered a withdrawal. The French suffered 4,000 casualties, while Wellesley's army lost 1,500 British, 1,000 Portuguese and 1000 Spaniards.

On the 30July the retreat from Sorauren cost the French 3,500 casualties, as they tried to get between Wellesley's army and San Sebastián. At Beunza, 5100 Portuguese and 4000 British fended off another attempt.

Aftermath

With his momentum lost, Soult withdrew into France to prepare his defence against the imminent Allied offensive.

Sources

External links

Battles of the Peninsular War
Battles involving the United Kingdom
Battles involving Portugal
Battles involving Spain
Battles involving France
Battle of Sorauren
Battle of Sorauren
July 1813 events
August 1813 events
Arthur Wellesley, 1st Duke of Wellington